Henry Rodgin "Rodge" Cohen (born 1944) is a prominent corporate lawyer whose practice focuses on commercial banking and financial institutions.  He is currently the senior chairman of the law firm Sullivan & Cromwell.

Early life and education 

Henry Rodgin Cohen was born in 1944, in the Fort Hill section of Charleston, West Virginia to Louis and Bertie (Rodgin) Cohen. His father ran drugstores and his mother was a high school teacher.

After studying in the local public schools through junior high, Cohen attended and graduated from Deerfield Academy in Massachusetts. He then graduated from Harvard College (1965),  and Harvard Law School (1968).

Career 

After two years in the U.S. Army as a military lawyer at Fort Monmouth, New Jersey, Cohen joined Sullivan & Cromwell LLP in 1970. Cohen served as Sullivan & Cromwell's Chairman from 2000 through the end of 2009. The Financial Times has called Cohen "one of the biggest players on Wall Street".  The Wall Street Journal refers to Cohen as "arguably the country's leading banking lawyer".  He has been called "the trauma surgeon of Wall Street".

Cohen participated in the bank negotiations in January 1981 that resulted in the freeing of the Americans held during the Iran hostage crisis. Cohen has also been a key player in the resolution of most major bank failures in recent decades, including Continental Illinois, First City, Southeast, Franklin National Bank and Bank of New England and, at the recommendation of the Federal Reserve, the Ohio thrift crisis during the U.S. Savings and Loan crisis in the 1980s. Following the September 11, 2001 attacks, Cohen was a leader in the Wall Street community rallying support for Lower Manhattan. Cohen is a trustee of Deerfield Academy, New York Presbyterian Hospital, the Hackley School, Hampton University and The Economic Club of New York, and is a member of the advisory boards of Wall Street Rising, United Way of Westchester-Putnam and the University of Charleston.

In 2009, Cohen was rumored to be considered for the post of Deputy Secretary of the Treasury in the Obama administration.

Regarding the worst economic crisis in 80 years, Cohen defended the financial system and Wall Street: "I am far from convinced there was something inherently wrong with the system."

Cohen was played by Robert J. Hogan in the 2011 film Too Big to Fail.

References

Further reading

1944 births
American law firm executives
Deerfield Academy alumni
Harvard College alumni
Harvard Law School alumni
Lawyers from Charleston, West Virginia
Living people
New York (state) lawyers
Sullivan & Cromwell people
20th-century American lawyers
21st-century American lawyers
Hampton University trustees